Pacific American School (PAS) is a private international school with an American-based curriculum located in East District, Hsinchu City, Taiwan. It was founded in 2007, and is recognized by The Western Association of Schools and Colleges. The school follows an American curriculum with instruction in English for students from grades K to 12.

Most graduates of PAS go on to attend colleges and universities in United States, although some choose to attend schools in other countries. According to Taiwanese law, students should hold non-Taiwanese passports in order to be admitted into American schools, though Pacific American School can allows exceptions.

Campus
Pas has a 3 story campus in Zhubei and is equipped with a wireless network that covers indoor areas of the school. Indoor facilities encompass 3 science laboratories, 1 computer lab, 1 small scale library, 1 dance studio, 1 auditorium, 2 art rooms, 1 music room, 1 clinic, 1 cafeteria and various classrooms. The school supports dormitory facilities for students and any student can choose to live in the dormitory on school days. The school building is designed to be a green building. Lockers are not provided.

Student life

College Admissions 
College admission is the focus and emphasis of Pacific American School's education curriculum. Successful matriculants attend top US universities including Columbia University in The City of New York, University of Pennsylvania, and more. The administration of Pacific American School prohibits its students to hire private college counselors or attend SAT cram classes. However, many students still sought outside help in order to get acceptances from top colleges.

Clubs
Pacific American Schools offer a variety of club activities for the elementary and middle school students.  High school students are free to organize their own clubs according to their interests and needs until school year 2021-2022. Club activities have converted to the school-wide Sustainabability Club driven by the Green initiative at PAS. Some of the current/previous high school clubs include:
 Chess
 Musical production
 Stage arts
 Rock band
 Basketball
 AUDS
 Photography
 Yearbook
 Typhoon Claw VEX Robotic

Model United Nations
PAS offers a Model United Nations program for selected high school students and middle school students. Ranging from local to international conferences, students participate as delegates, ambassadors, judges, and chairpersons in conferences such as but not limited to:
 The Hague International Model United Nations (THIMUN)
 THIMUN Singapore
 Pacific American School Model United Nations (PASMUN)
 Hsinchu Model United Nations (HSINMUN)
 Southern Taiwan Model United Nations (STMUN)
 Taiwan Model United Nations (TAIMUN)

Student Government
PAS has a student government, named STUCO, where elections are held every year. Voting results are based on 50% interview and 50% direct electoral vote.

Sports Teams
 Track & Field Team
 Soccer Team
 Badminton Team
 Boys' Basketball Team
 Girls' Basketball Team
 Swimming Team
 Co-ed Cheerleading Squad
 Table Tennis Team

See also

 Taipei American School
 Hsinchu American School
 National Experimental High School
 Morrison Academy
 American School in Taichung
 Kaohsiung American School
 Taipei Adventist American School
 Taiwan Adventist International School
 The Primacy Collegiate Academy

References

2007 establishments in Taiwan
American international schools in Taiwan
Educational institutions established in 2007
Schools in Hsinchu